Doi Tao may refer to:
 Doi Tao District
 Doi Tao Subdistrict